Bannberscheid is an Ortsgemeinde – a community belonging to a Verbandsgemeinde – in the Westerwaldkreis in Rhineland-Palatinate, Germany.

Geography

The community lies north of Montabaur some 260 m in elevation in meadowland with a gradually climbing slope, within the low mountain landscape of the Westerwald, which is framed by the high Westerwald and the Montabaur Heights (Montabaurer Höhenzug). Since 1971 the community has belonged to what was then the newly founded Verbandsgemeinde of Wirges, a kind of collective municipality.

History
In 1211, Bannberscheid had its first documentary mention. From 1895 to 1897, the village church was built. The community was electrified in 1921 and in 1937 it was connected to the sewer system. Until the 1960s, clay quarrying was the community's main source of income.

Politics

Community council
The council is made up of 13 council members, including the extraofficial mayor (Bürgermeister), who were elected in a majority vote in a municipal election on 7 June 2009.

Coat of arms
The community's arms were introduced in 1992 upon a decision by the council. They show a bend sinister of silver and red dividing the field into blue and gold. Above is a gold waterwheel and below along the shield's edge are three blue steps.

Economy and infrastructure

West of the community runs Bundesstraße 255, which leads from Montabaur to Rennerod. The nearest Autobahn interchange is Montabaur on the A 3 (Cologne–Frankfurt am Main), some 3 km away. The nearest InterCityExpress stop is at the railway station at Montabaur on the Cologne-Frankfurt high-speed rail line.

References

External links
 Bannberscheid in the collective municipality’s Web pages 

Municipalities in Rhineland-Palatinate
Westerwaldkreis